Emerald Soup was a 1963 British children's science fiction television series. Consisting of seven 25-minute episodes produced by ABC Weekend TV for the ITV network, the series was aired weekly from Saturday 9 November to Saturday 21 December 1963. Each episode except the last one ended with a scene to be resolved the following week via a quote from William Shakespeare. The last episode ended with the discovery of a gem (an emerald?).
Norman Bogner acted as the Script Editor. The series conflicted in part with the initial episodes of the BBC series Doctor Who, also broadcast on Saturdays, which started on 23 November 1963.

Synopsis
The series was set in a small rural community, where a group of local children discovers, constructed in the vicinity, a laboratory that is conducting secret radiation tests. The children attempt to stop the tests before any damage to the environment can be done.

Cast
Jessica Maxwell - Jessica Spencer
John Maxwell - William Dexter
Jo Maxwell - Janina Faye
Gally Lloyd - Karl Lanchbury
Tim Maxwell - Gregory Phillips
Penny Dalton - Annette Andre
Poynter - Michael Bangerter
Mrs Evans - Ethel Gabriel
Gaunt - Allan McClelland
Lee - Frederic Abbott
Pascoe - Blake Butler

References

External links

Emerald Soup at the BFI Film and TV Database

1963 British television series debuts
1963 British television series endings
1960s British children's television series
Television shows produced by ABC Weekend TV
Television series by ITV Studios
1960s British science fiction television series
ITV children's television shows
English-language television shows
Lost television shows